Georges Callot (1857–1903) a French artist and educator, known for his nude, allegorical, and genre paintings. He also worked as a decorative painter.

Biography 
Georges Callot was born 1857 in Paris, France. Callot studied at the École des Arts Décoratifs and then at the École des Beaux-Arts with Louis-Émile Adan.

Callot first participated in the Salon in 1877. In 1890, he joined the Société Nationale des Beaux-Arts as a member. Callot taught classes at Académie Delécluse, an atelier-style art school and he was one of the main instructors.

Callot painted, La Philosophie (1903) for the Hôtel de Ville, Paris.

Death and legacy 
Georges Callot died on 23 June 1903 in Paris. His work can be found in various public museum collections including Art Renewal Center, Châlons-en-Champagne, Musée d'Orsay, among others.

In the Spanish book, Lesbianas, Discursos y Representaciones (2008), Callot is named as one of the many artists that created anti-feminist work.

References

External links 

1857 births
1903 deaths
French genre painters
19th-century French male artists
19th-century French painters
Artists from Paris
École nationale supérieure des arts décoratifs alumni
École des Beaux-Arts alumni
French salon-holders